Werner's toad (Rhaebo nasicus, formerly Bufo nasicus; in Spanish sapo narigudo) is a species of toad in the family Bufonidae. It is found in northwestern Guyana and eastern Venezuela at elevations of  asl.

Description
Rhaebo nasicus is a medium-sized, long-legged toad. A male measured  and two females  in snout–vent length. The dorsal colouration is variable, from greyish brown to reddish brown. There are often darker spots, a dark brown hourglass patch, and/or an ochre middorsal stripe. Edge of lower jaw has a white stripe or row of white spots. Parotoid glands are moderately large. Upper eyelid is spiny. Snout is sharply pointed.

Diet
Diet consists of ants, other arthropods (termites, beetles), and snails.

Habitat and conservation
Its natural habitats are cloud forests and lowland moist forests. Breeding habitat is unknown.

It is a locally common species that is not facing major threats.

References

nasicus
Amphibians of Guyana
Amphibians of Venezuela
Taxonomy articles created by Polbot
Amphibians described in 1903